Oenopion is a genus of darkling beetles in the  family Tenebrionidae. There are at least three described species in Oenopion.

Species
These three species belong to the genus Oenopion:
 Oenopion adeptus Doyen, 1971
 Oenopion gibbosus Champion, 1885
 Oenopion zopheroides (Horn 1874)

References

Tenebrionidae